Friedrichsdorf is a town in Germany.

Friedrichsdorf, literally meaning "Friedrich's village" is also a former name of:

Darskowo, Drawsko County, Poland,
Bykowina, Poland
Frydrychowo, Wąbrzeźno County, Poland
Nova Gradiška, Croatia